La Antigua (L'Antigua in Leonese language) is a municipality (pop. 606)  in the province of León, Spain.

References

Municipalities in the Province of León